Whitehills Football Club are a Scottish football club from the village of Whitehills, near Banff, Aberdeenshire. Members of the Scottish Junior Football Association North Region, they currently play in the North Second Division Founded in 1999 playing in local Welfare competitions, the club stepped up to the Junior grade the following season but have yet to win any honours at this level. Their home ground is School Park in Eastside of Whitehills and club colours are red.

History

External links
 Scottish Football Historical Archive
 Non-League Scotland

Football in Aberdeenshire
Football clubs in Scotland
Scottish Junior Football Association clubs
Association football clubs established in 1999
1999 establishments in Scotland